Furkan Aldemir (born August 9, 1991) is a Turkish professional basketball player who last played for Darüşşafaka of the Turkish Basketbol Süper Ligi (BSL) and the EuroLeague.

Professional career

Turkey
Aldemir made his professional debut in the Turkish Basketball Super League with Karşıyaka during the 2007–08 season. In June 2011, he signed a four-year deal with Galatasaray. In May 2014, he signed a new three-year, €3.9 million net income contract with Galatasaray. On November 24, 2014, he announced via Facebook, of his decision to leave Galatasaray, in pursuit of an NBA contract. On December 1, 2014, he officially parted ways with Galatasaray.

NBA

Aldemir was selected by the Los Angeles Clippers with the 53rd overall pick of the 2012 NBA draft, and then subsequently traded to the Houston Rockets, in a four-team trade. On July 13, 2013, his rights were traded, along with Royce White, to the Philadelphia 76ers.

On December 15, 2014, Aldemir signed with the Philadelphia 76ers. He made his NBA debut the same day, against the Boston Celtics, recording 2 points, 2 rebounds, and 1 assist, in a 105–87 loss. On October 26, 2015, he was waived by the 76ers.

Return to Europe
On November 7, 2015, Aldemir signed a four-year contract with Darüşşafaka.

International career
Aldemir was a regular Turkish youth national team player, as he won a bronze medal at the 2009 FIBA Europe Under-18 Championship. He also played at the 2010 FIBA Europe Under-20 Championship, where he averaged 11.6 rebounds per game. A year later, he played at the 2011 FIBA Europe Under-20 Championship, where he averaged 14.8 points, 15.9 rebounds, 1.3 assists, and 1.7 blocks per game. He was named to the All-Tournament team for his performance. He went on to play for the senior men's Turkish national basketball team at the FIBA EuroBasket 2013 qualification, and the 2014 FIBA Basketball World Cup.

Career statistics

NBA

Regular season

|-
| style="text-align:left;"| 
| style="text-align:left;"| Philadelphia
| 41 || 9 || 13.2 || .513 || .000 || .481 || 4.3 || .7 || .4 || .4 || 2.3
|- class="sortbottom"
| style="text-align:left;"| Career
| style="text-align:left;"|
| 41 || 9 || 13.2 || .513 || .000 || .481 || 4.3 || .7 || .4 || .4 || 2.3

EuroLeague

|-
| style="text-align:left;"| 2011–12
| style="text-align:left;" rowspan=3| Galatasaray
| 15 || 7 || 16.8 || .557 || .000 || .795 || 4.8 || .5 || .7 || .4 || 6.6 || 92
|-
| style="text-align:left;"| 2013–14
| 22 || 13 || 17.4 || .654 || .000 || .515 || 6.3 || .7 || .5 || 1.0 || 5.4 || 10.0
|-
| style="text-align:left;"| 2014–15
| 6 || 6 || 20.7 || .750 || .000 || .733 || 6.2 || .3 || .7 || 1.3 || 7.8 || 12.7
|-
| style="text-align:left;"| 2015–16
| style="text-align:left;" rowspan=2| Darüşşafaka
| 13 || 0 || 9.2 || .704 || .000 || .400 || 2.8 || .3 || .2 || .5 || 3.2 || 4.8
|-
| style="text-align:left;"| 2016–17
| 30 || 6 || 9.4 || .375 || .000 || .481 || 2.5 || .2 || .1 || .4 || 1.6 || 2.5
|- class="sortbottom"
| style="text-align:left;"| Career
| style="text-align:left;"|
| 86 || 32 || 13.6 || .588 || .000 || .613 || 4.2 || .4 || .3 || .6 || 4.1 || 6.7

References

External links

 

Furkan Aldemir at draftexpress.com
Furkan Aldemir at eurobasket.com
Furkan Aldemir at euroleague.net
Furkan Aldemir at tblstat.net
Furkan Aldemir at fiba.com

1991 births
Living people
Centers (basketball)
Darüşşafaka Basketbol players
Galatasaray S.K. (men's basketball) players
Karşıyaka basketball players
Los Angeles Clippers draft picks
National Basketball Association players from Turkey
People from Konak
Philadelphia 76ers players
Power forwards (basketball)
Sportspeople from İzmir
Turkish expatriate basketball people in the United States
Turkish men's basketball players
2014 FIBA Basketball World Cup players